Gokulam Kerala FC is an Indian professional football club based in Kozhikode, Kerala. The club was founded in January 2017 as Gokulam FC and started to compete in I-League, the top division of club football system in India, from 2017-18 season.

Title & honours

General
Records and statistics of only official matches are counted. This include matches played in I-League and Indian Super Cup. Friendlies are unofficial matches, and therefore aren't counted.

First match: 1-0 loss (away to Shillong Lajong, I-League, 27 November 2017)
First win: 0-2 (away to Indian Arrows, I-League, 22 December 2017)
First goalscorer: Kamo Stephane Bayi
First Indian goalscorer: Santu Singh

All time record

Appearances
 
Most appearances in all competitions: 51 –  Aminou Bouba 
Most appearances in I-League: 43   Thahir Zaman
Most appearances in Indian Super Cup: 2 – 11 different players
Most appearances in Durand Cup: 5 – 4 different players
Most appearances in IFA Shield: 8 –  Ngangom Ronald Singh
Longest Serving Player: From 2017 –2022  Muhammed Rashid

Most appearances

25-36 appearances

15-24 appearances

Goals
 
All time top scorer:  Marcus Joseph – 26 goals
Most goals in I-League –  Marcus Joseph(14 goals)
Most goals in Indian Super Cup – Henry Kisekka (3 goals)
Most goals in Durand Cup –  Marcus Joseph (11 goals)
Most goals in Sheikh Kamal Cup – Henry Kisekka (3 goals)
Most goals in IFA Shield – Rahim Osumanu (5 goals)
Most goals in AFC Cup – Luka Majcen (2 goals)

Most Goals

Top scorers

Goal scorers

Top scorer by season

Mile stones

Assists

Clean sheets

Head coach's record

Club captains

Head to head records

References

Gokulam Kerala FC related lists